Danilo Carlo Petrucci (born 24 October 1990) is an Italian Grand Prix motorcycle racer who has competed in the MotoAmerica Superbike Championship with Warhorse HSBK Racing Ducati New York. After losing his KTM ride in MotoGP at the end of the 2021 season, he entered the 2022 Dakar Rally with a Tech3 KTM rally raid 450 cc machine in January 2022.

For most of 2022, Petrucci was based in Scranton, Pennsylvania, U.S., riding a Ducati Panigale V4R in the AMA Superbike Championship series, finishing second at the last event in September. In November of that same year it was announced that Petrucci would return to the Barni Ducati team, this time in the Superbike World Championship.  

He won two races in the MotoGP World Championship, and also won the Italian Superbike Championship (CIV) in 2011.

Career

Early career
Born in Terni, Petrucci began racing in 1998 with mini-trial and mini-cross bikes, achieving some national trophies. In 2006 he switched to road racing entering the CBR600 Cup where he emerged as the best rookie. In 2007 Petrucci competed in the Yamaha R6 Cup and made some appearances in the European Superstock 600 Championship. His runner-up position in the R6 Cup granted him official support from Yamaha Motor Italia for the following seasons. In 2008 Petrucci contested his first full international season in the European Superstock 600 championship, scoring two poles and earning seventh place overall in the final championships standings. In 2009 he won three races and earned fourth place overall in the European championship; in the same season he became runner-up in the Italian Superstock 1000 championship and won the Under-23 class. In 2010 Petrucci entered the FIM Superstock 1000 Championship riding for Team Pedercini, while competing also for the Italian Superbike Championship. In the latter championship, he finished in third place overall and won the Under-25 title. In 2011 he again competed in the FIM Superstock 1000 Championship, riding a Ducati 1098R entered by the Barni Racing Team. With four victories and six poles, he ended the season as runner-up behind Davide Giugliano. He also contested the Italian Superstock 1000 championship, winning the championship title.

MotoGP World Championship

Came IodaRacing Project (2012–2014)
Petrucci joined the Ioda team in the MotoGP class in 2012, riding a Claiming Rule Teams (CRT) motorcycle with an in-house Ioda chassis and an Aprilia RSV4 engine. The team switched to using a Suter chassis and BMW engines midway through the season. Petrucci finished 19th overall in the championship and 7th in the CRT class with 27 points.

Ioda continued with Suter/BMW machinery and expanded their MotoGP team to field two bikes in 2013, with Lukáš Pešek as the second rider. Petrucci finished 17th overall in the championship and 5th in the CRT class with 26 points.

Petrucci remained with Ioda for the 2014 season, however the team dropped back to a single entry in the championship and returned to Aprilia machinery. Petrucci suffered a fractured wrist from a crash during the warm-up session for the Spanish Grand Prix at Jerez. Michel Fabrizio replaced Petrucci for rounds 6 and 7. Petrucci returned for the Dutch TT at Assen. Petrucci eventually finished 20th overall in the championship and 5th in the Open class with 17 points.

Pramac Racing (2015–2018)
On 1 October 2014, it was announced that Petrucci would leave the Ioda team and move to Pramac Racing with a two-year contract, starting with the 2015 season. He replaced Andrea Iannone, who moved to the factory Ducati Team. Petrucci took his first podium finish at the British Grand Prix in August. After starting 18th on the grid, Petrucci moved through the order in wet conditions, and ultimately finished second behind Valentino Rossi.

He missed the first four races after suffering a broken hand in a pre-season testing crash at Phillip Island. Upon return he once again excelled in wet conditions during Dutch TT where he set the fastest lap and briefly led before the race was stopped (he ultimately retired with an electrical failure).

He starts his sixth consecutive season in Motogp for the same team, but riding a factory spec bike and with the same teammate from 2016. On 4 June 2017 he climbs on the third step of the podium at the Italian Grand Prix,in Assen he manages to get on the podium again, finishing second. He finished second in the San Marino Grand Prix. In Japan he finished third. He ended the season in 8th place with 124 points.

In 2018 he was in the same team, with teammate Jack Miller. In France, he finished in second place. He ended the season in 8th place with 144 points.

Ducati Team (2019–2020)
In 2019, he moved to the Ducati factory team to pair with Andrea Dovizioso. He finished in third place at Le Mans. He achieved his first victory in MotoGP in the following race at Mugello. He finished in third place at Catalunya. He ended the season in 6th place with 176 points.

In 2020 he remained with the same team. He won at Le Mans in wet race conditions after being in the lead from start to finish. He ended the season in twelfth place with 78 points.

Tech3 KTM Factory Racing (2021) 
For the 2021 season Petrucci was signed by the KTM satellite team Tech3. He had a best result of 5th place throughout the season and finished 21st in the standings with 37 points. At the Styrian GP in August news broke that he had lost his ride and would be exiting MotoGP at the end of the season.

Team Suzuki Ecstar (2022)
On 26 September 2022, it was announced that Petrucci would replace the injured Joan Mir for the Thailand Grand Prix in Buriram, after the US Superbike season had ended. Petrucci finished in position 20, in front of one regular rider and one replacement, and later confirmed he had no team arrangements for 2023.

Dakar Rally
Petrucci suffered a broken leg training in December 2021. During the 2022 event, he placed 23rd in the prologue event, followed by 13th in the first stage. He retired from the second stage with machine failure after , and had to be rescued by helicopter. Petrucci continued on in the rally after a nearly 12-hour time penalty for his failure to finish the stage. On stage five, Petrucci took his first Dakar stage victory after fellow KTM rider Toby Price received a time penalty.

MotoAmerica Superbike Championship (2022)
Petrucci won both legs of his inaugural race in the 2022 MotoAmerica Superbike Championship at COTA, near Austin, Texas, on the weekend of 9 and 10 April.

Petrucci won the first leg of two at Road Atlanta in late April, leading the championship on points. His Ducati suffered an engine failure in the second leg.

Petrucci finished the season and AMA championship in second place to Jake Gagne in September 2022.

Superbike World Championship

Barni Spark Ducati Racing Team (from 2023)
Petrucci will compete for the Barni Ducati Team from 2023 Superbike World Championship season.

Career statistics

Career summary

FIM Superstock 1000 Cup

Races by year
(key) (Races in bold indicate pole position; races in italics indicate fastest lap)

Grand Prix motorcycle racing

By season

By class

Races by year
(key) (Races in bold indicate pole position, races in italics indicate fastest lap)

Superbike World Championship

By season

Races by year
(key) (Races in bold indicate pole position) (Races in italics indicate fastest lap)

* Season still in progress.

AMA Superbike Championship

Races by season

Races by year

Dakar Rally

References

External links

 

1990 births
Living people
Italian motorcycle racers
Pramac Racing MotoGP riders
FIM Superstock 1000 Cup riders
People from Terni
Sportspeople from the Province of Terni
MotoGP World Championship riders
Ducati Corse MotoGP riders
Motorcycle racers of Fiamme Oro
Tech3 MotoGP riders
Off-road motorcycle racers
Dakar Rally motorcyclists
Suzuki MotoGP riders
Superbike World Championship riders